Apatelarthron heteroclitum is a species of beetle in the family Cerambycidae, and the only species in the genus Apatelarthron. It was described by J. Thomson in 1864.

References

Pteropliini
Beetles described in 1864